On 24 June 1956, a British Overseas Airways Corporation (BOAC) four-engined Canadair C-4 Argonaut airliner crashed into a tree on departure from Kano Airport in Nigeria, three crew and 29 passengers were killed.

Crash
At 17:21 the Argonaut departed Runway 25 at Kano Airport on the way to Tripoli in Libya. The flight was from Lagos to London and had made a scheduled stop at Kano. It was raining as the aircraft reached  when the aircraft began to lose height. Three of the seven crew members and 29 of the 38 passengers were killed in the crash, two crew and two passengers were seriously injured.

Investigation
A team from the British Ministry of Transport and Civil Aviation and BOAC flew out from London on 25 June in a chartered Canadair Argonaut to help in the investigation. The Nigerian investigation team of four was led by the Director of Civil Aviation.

Inquiry report
The Board of Inquiry concluded "The accident was the result of a loss of height and airspeed caused by the aircraft encountering, at approximately 250ft after take-off, an unpredictable thunderstorm cell which gave rise to a sudden reversal of wind direction, heavy rain, and possible downdraft conditions. The formation of the cell could not have been predicted by the meteorological forecaster at Kano airport, nor was it visible to the pilot in command before taking off. In the circumstances, no blame can be attached to the pilot in command for taking off."

The report also recommended that the International Civil Aviation Organization urgently consider investigating the special hazards to aircraft inherent in taking off or landing in close proximity to thunderstorms.

References
Citations

Bibliography

Accidents and incidents involving the Canadair North Star
Airliner accidents and incidents caused by microbursts
Aviation accidents and incidents in 1956
Aviation accidents and incidents in Nigeria
Canadair C4 1956
1956 in Nigeria
1956 meteorology
June 1956 events in Africa
1956 disasters in Nigeria